Alex Bapela (born 4 October 1969) is a South African former footballer who played at both professional and international levels as a midfielder. Bapela played club football for Real Rovers and Mamelodi Sundowns; he also earned six caps for the South African national side between 1999 and 2000.

External links

1969 births
Living people
South African soccer players
South Africa international soccer players
1998 African Cup of Nations players
2000 African Cup of Nations players
Mamelodi Sundowns F.C. players
Association football midfielders